Garth Owen-Smith (22 February 1944 – 11 April 2020) was a South African-Namibian environmentalist. He was awarded the Goldman Environmental Prize in 1993, jointly with Margaret Jacobsohn, for their efforts on conservation of wildlife in Namibia, where illegal hunting was threatening species such as elephants, lions and black rhinos.

He was awarded the Global 500 Roll of Honour in 1994.

References

External links
Garth Owen-Smith (1944-2020) – A great tree has fallen, Daily Maverick

1944 births
2020 deaths
White Namibian people
Namibian environmentalists
Goldman Environmental Prize awardees